Teotlalco (Nahuatl pronunciation:[teotɬálko]) was a Nahua princess of Ecatepec and Aztec empress—the Queen of Tenochtitlan.

Family

Teotlalco's father was King Matlaccohuatl.  She married Emperor Moctezuma II of Tenochtitlan. The first contact between Indigenous civilizations of Mesoamerica and Europeans took place during his reign, and he was killed.  Teotlalco was Moctezuma's principal wife and mother of Doña Isabel Moctezuma, wife of the king Cuitláhuac.  Her grandchild was Leonor Cortés Moctezuma.

See also

List of Tenochtitlan rulers
Tlapalizquixochtzin
Aztec emperors family tree

References

External links 

Queens of Tenochtitlan
Tenochca nobility
16th-century Mexican people
16th-century indigenous people of the Americas
1500s in the Aztec civilization
1510s in the Aztec civilization
Nobility of the Americas